The 2017 Supercopa Argentina Final was the 6th edition of the Supercopa Argentina, an annual football match contested by the winners of the Argentine Primera División and Copa Argentina competitions. The match was played at the Estadio Malvinas Argentinas in the city of  Mendoza on 14 March 2018.

Boca Juniors and River Plate qualified after winning the 2016–17 Argentine Primera División tournament and the 2016–17 Copa Argentina, respectively. It was the second time in history and first since 1976 that the two most important Argentine clubs faced each other in a final match.

River Plate defeated Boca Juniors 2–0 to win their first Supercopa Argentina title.

Qualified teams

Match

Details

Statistics

References 

2018 in Argentine football
2016
Supercopa Argentina 2017
Supercopa Argentina 2017